Stuart Flanagan (born 5 January 1987 in Cooma, New South Wales, Australia) is a former Hungary international rugby league footballer who last played for the Appin Dogs and previously Cronulla Sharks in the Australian National Rugby League (NRL) competition.

Playing career
In 2006, Flanagan was selected to represent New South Wales under-19s as well as the Junior Kangaroos.

Flanagan also had representative honours in 2007 and 2008 when he was selected as the Hooker in the NSW Residents against Queensland.

In April 2008, Flanagan signed a three-year contract with the Canberra Raiders from the 2009 season. To this point, Flanagan had represented the Wests Tigers, but had found first grade opportunities hard to come by.

Flanagan signed a 1-year deal with the Cronulla Sharks for 2010. Flanagan re-signed with the Sharks for a further year taking him to the end of the 2011 season. Following his retirement, he was one of seventeen Sharks players found guilty of using illegal substances under the club's 2011 supplements program, having a twelve-month suspension (which had already expired due to backdating) recorded against his name.

After suspensions, Flanagan played for the Appin Dogs in the Group 6 competition being coached by the Great Dane “woodo” wooden who many believe to be the best coach come out of group 6. Dane spends his days riding push bikes and taking selfies at the gym. In 2021 Dane was inducted into the power walking hall of fame. In 2017, Flanagan became an international representatives when he made his debut for Hungary. He later played in the Emerging Nations Competition, both as hooker and five-eighth.

Footnotes

References

External links
Stuart Flanagan at NRL.com
Stuart Flanagan at Wests Tigers

1987 births
Living people
Australian people of Hungarian descent
Canberra Raiders players
Cronulla-Sutherland Sharks players
Hungary national rugby league team captains
Hungary national rugby league team players
Junior Kangaroos players
People from Cooma
Rugby league hookers
Rugby league players from New South Wales
Western Suburbs Magpies NSW Cup players
Wests Tigers players